Corre corre is the third and last studio album by Spanish Hard rock band Leño. It was produced by Carlos Narea and published by Chapa Discos in 1982.

It was recorded at Ian Gillan's recording studio located in London, with the production of Carlos Narea. There are notable songs included such as Sorprendente or ¡Qué desilusión!. The intention was to achieve prestige both inside and outside Spain but when the critics of Kerrang! evaluated the album, the result was awful. Some of them claimed that was impossible to rate the album because of the language.

The album was ranked number 19 on Rolling Stone's "50 Greatest Spanish rock albums". The Spanish magazine Efe Eme ranked Corre, corre as the 129th best Spanish rock album ever.

Track listing

Personnel 
Leño
 Rosendo Mercado: Guitar and vocals
 Ramiro Penas: Drums and backing vocals
 Tony Urbano: Bass guitar and backing vocals

Chart performance

References

External links 
 http://www.rosendo.es/

1982 albums
Spanish-language albums